Kalik (also Romanized as Kalīk and Kolyak) is a village in Tavabe-e Kojur Rural District, Kojur District, Nowshahr County, Mazandaran Province, Iran. At the 2006 census, its population was 149, in 31 families.

References 

Populated places in Nowshahr County